Clarence Robinson (born 23 September 1949) is a Jamaican boxer. He competed in the men's featherweight event at the 1976 Summer Olympics. At the 1976 Summer Olympics, he lost to Choi Chung-il of South Korea.

References

External links
 

1949 births
Living people
Jamaican male boxers
Olympic boxers of Jamaica
Boxers at the 1976 Summer Olympics
Place of birth missing (living people)
Featherweight boxers
20th-century Jamaican people